The Canadian province of Manitoba held municipal elections on Wednesday, October 22, 2014. Election day was held on July 25, 2014 for several beach resorts including Winnipeg Beach, Dunnottar and Victoria Beach. Mayors, councillors, and school board trustees were elected. Candidate registration opened on May 1, 2014 and closed on September 16, 2014.

Brandon

Mayor

Dauphin

Mayor

East St. Paul

Mayor

Flin Flon

Mayor

Gimli

Mayor

Hanover

Reeve

La Broquerie

Reeve

Macdonald

Reeve

Morden

Mayor

Niverville

Mayor

Portage la Prairie (R.M.)

Reeve

Portage la Prairie (City)

Mayor

Ritchot

Mayoral

Mayoral by-election: July 19, 2017

Rockwood

Reeve

Selkirk

Mayor

Springfield

Reeve

St. Andrews

Reeve

Stanley

Mayor

St. Clements

Mayor

Steinbach

Mayor

City council

Taché

Mayor

The Pas

Mayor

Thompson

Mayor

Winkler

Mayor

Winnipeg

Mayor

City council

References

External links

Municipal elections in Manitoba
2014 elections in Canada
2014 in Manitoba
October 2014 events in Canada